Drymou is a village in the Paphos District of Cyprus, located 3 km west of Fyti, with a population of about 100 people at an altitude of . It is between the Troodos mountains and the sea and is surrounded by wild vegetation and grain crops, olive trees, vineyards and almond trees.

References

Communities in Paphos District